Philip Bates (born 30 March 1953) is an English musician who has been a member of many notable bands, including Trickster and Quill, and was the lead guitarist, songwriter and joint lead vocalist for ELO Part II from 1993 through to 1999 and then its successor band The Orchestra from 2007 to 2011 and both times being replaced by Parthenon Huxley.

He was also briefly the singer and guitarist for a reunited Move, from 2004 to 2007, under the leadership of ELO and ELO part 2 drummer Bev Bevan.

Biography
Bates was born in Tamworth, Staffordshire, England.  At the age of twelve he formed his first band, The Wild Four, which was soon renamed The Teenbeats. Bates moved away from his home town of Tamworth at age 17 in 1970, living in Handsworth, Birmingham, and working in Birmingham music store, Ringway Music (which was owned by jazz musicians Ken Ingarfield, Lionel Rubin, and George Watts).

Early bands
In 1970, Bates joined Wolverhampton heavy-rock band, JUG, playing several stints at Glasgow's infamous Electric Garden on Sauchiehall Street. Next was a complete musical reversal when Bates joined cabaret/folk band, Enigma, which was being groomed to challenge the New Seekers, by Morgan Music/Studios in London.
Enigma became Quill in 1972, releasing a single 'Spent The Rent' on the EMI's Parlophone label. Next was a stint as a solo artist, with a publishing deal with Southern Music, and a single. 'Mr Hand Me Down' released under the name Billy Bates on Spark Records followed in 1974. In 1976, Bates put out 'Take to the Mountains' under the name, Billy Bates Company. During the 1970s, Bates established himself as a session musician on the London recording scene, doing sessions for Billy Ocean, Alvin Stardust ... and for producers like Steve Lillywhite, Colin Thurston and Tony Visconti, plus many TV and radio jingles.

Trickster
During a spell as a resident musician in London's Piccadilly at the Piazza restaurant, Bates formed Trickster. Trickster released one single, 'Flyaway', on the United Artists label before signing with ELO's record label, Jet Records, and being managed by the infamous Don Arden. Several singles and two albums were released by Jet, 'Find the Lady' and 'Back to Zero'. Trickster enjoyed minor chart successes with the singles 'If That's The Way The Feeling Takes You' in the US, and 'I'm Satisfied' in the UK, and featured as support band on ELO's ground-breaking and spectacular 1978 Spaceship world tour. Trickster also appeared as Boston's "Special Guest" during their 1979 tour for "Don't Look Back".

Quill and Don't Panic
In 1981, after Trickster left Jet Records label, Bates moved back to Birmingham and re-joined Quill (sometimes referred to as "Kwil"), where he met his future wife, Jo, with whom he later formed the band, Don't Panic. After a period writing songs for RCA/Arista Music, Don't Panic spent three years, 1987–1990, playing the hotel circuit in the United Arab Emirates, in Dubai and Abu Dhabi. In 1990, Don't Panic returned home just as the first Gulf war started.

Atlantic
Bates resumed solo work, and jingle writing/singing/playing at the Old Smithy Studios, Worcester, where he also became lead singer/songwriter and playing guitar, keyboards and bass with the AOR band, Atlantic. Atlantic released one CD, Power. Around the same time, Bates was the featured vocalist on the theme song for The Gladiators TV programme, and featured on several tracks of the accompanying gold-selling album.

ELO Part II
In 1993, Bates met up with old friend Kelly Groucutt, who had been ELO bassist, resulting in Bates joining ELO Part 2, replacing Pete Haycock and Neil Lockwood. ELO Part 2 took the music of ELO around the world, often playing with symphony orchestras in large venues around the globe. Extensive touring in Australia, New Zealand, Argentina, Brazil, Peru, Chile, US, Canada, Latvia, Lithuania, Russia, Poland, Czechoslovakia, South Africa, UK followed ... until 1999, when Bates quit to spend more time with his family, and to pursue a long-held ambition to study for a degree.

Solo work and recent career
After supporting his studies with all manner of gigs, stints in call centres, and a period as a bookseller in Hay-on-Wye, Bates graduated from the University of Wales in 2003 with a History BA Hons. The solo albums 'Naked' and 'Agony & Ecstasy' were released in 1996 and 1998, plus tours of the UK and Germany with Mik Kaminski. Two further solo albums, Alter Ego (2003) and One Sky (2005) followed. All released on Bates's own labels, DPP, and latterly Essential Music. A compilation CD Retrospectiv, also on Essential, was released in 2007.

After leaving ELO Part 2, Bates became a member of the Eleanor Rigby Experience, along with Andy Bole, Maartin Allcock, Clive Bunker and Tina McBain, who released 2 CDs and toured extensively in the UK. A short stint with The Bev Bevan Band and "Bev Bevan's Move" followed (2003/2005), along with the formation in the same year of German-based band, ELB (Electric Light Band). In 2007, Bates rejoined his old mates from ELO Part 2 in The Orchestra (featuring members of ELO and Part 2).

In 2008, Bates formed the Beatles, Blues and Blue Violin project (BBBV) with Mik Kaminski and Tina McBain, resulting in a tour, and the 2010 BBBV album.

In 2022 ansd 2023, Bates is still gigging extensively with his "Tribute to ELO" throughout Europe as "Phil Bates and Band". He has often appeared live on German, Swiss and Polish TV playing ELO songs. He plays guitar and several other instruments on Les Penning's album Belerion, which was released in December 2016.

References

External links
Phil Bates Official Website

1953 births
Living people
People from Tamworth, Staffordshire
English rock guitarists